Security check may refer to:

 Checkpoint (disambiguation), for physical checks
 Background check, a process used to verify that an individual is who they claim to be
 Security check (scientology)
 Vetting, an enhanced form of background check